WRVU is a student-run college radio station associated with, but not operated by, Vanderbilt University in Nashville, Tennessee.  It broadcasts via streaming radio, and from 1973 to 2014, it was also broadcast on licensed radio stations in Nashville.  The station is operated as a division of Vanderbilt Student Communications (VSC),

History

Early stations
A clandestine station at Vanderbilt University was set up by student Ken Berryhill around 1951 under the name "the Voice of the Commodore", but was shut down soon after, when the university administration discovered the antenna wire draped around Cole Hall.  Berryhill then worked to convince the administration to form a committee for a formal station.  After Berryhill was drafted into the Korean War in 1952, the committee gained the support of the university and of commercial station WSM, which donated equipment.

The officially-sanctioned student station went on the air on March 30, 1953. As a very low powered carrier current station, it did not require a license from the Federal Communications Commission FCC) or qualify for official call letters, however it did adopt the self-assigned identifier of "WVU". The FCC told the station that using the campus high-voltage electrical grid as an antenna was causing it to exceed the legal range of an unlicensed station, so it had to re-wire through the campus steam tunnels to multiple buildings and use the low-voltage grid in those buildings to stay legal.

91.1

Prior to moving to VU's Sarratt Student Center in the 1973, the station  broadcast from studios in one of the towers of Neely Auditorium.  It was at the Neely Auditorium studio that the station received its first FCC approval to begin broadcasting on 91.1 MHz.

Vanderbilt Student Communications, Inc. applied for a new non-commercial educational FM station construction permit on September 25, 1970; the permit, for 10 watts on 91.1 MHz at Nashville, was granted on January 28, 1971, the callsign WRVU assigned on May 17, 1971, and the full station license issued on August 1, 1973.

An increase to 430 watts was granted by a construction permit in December 1973 and updated license in July 1974.  About 1985, WRVU increased power to 14,500 watts, but had been decreased to 10,500 watts by 2003.

Transition from 91.1

 The license was granted, and in 2016, radio station WXNA-LP began broadcasting with much of the same community programming previously heard on the 91.1 FM incarnation of WRVU.

After over-the-air broadcasting
 For this reason, WRVU became an internet-only station, ceasing its terrestrial (traditional or analog) broadcast signal.

Programming

Students and others broadcast numerous shows every week on WRVU; most are one to two hours in length.  When shows are not being hosted, either because of unfilled time slots or breaks in the academic calendar, WRVU's music stream remains continuous through the use of its autorotation music program, known as "DJ HAL" to students.

WRVU broadcasts 24 hours a day all year long; prior to the mid-1990s, the station shut down operations entirely during the summer and Christmas and New Year's holiday breaks.

The station is run by student volunteers from VU, although in the past, many of its disc jockeys were Vanderbilt alumni or community volunteers. As with most student-operated college stations, its general focus is to play independent-label music. From the 1970s until the mid-2000s (with the sign-on of WRFN-LP), WRVU was practically the only widely accessible outlet for the area's underground music acts to have their recordings get airtime.

References

Radio stations established in 1953
RVU
Internet radio stations in the United States
RVU
Vanderbilt University media